This is a list of Representatives elected to the House of Representatives  at the 2009 general election, held on 30 August 2009, for the Forty-Fifth election period of the House of Representatives beginning with the 172nd session of the National Diet of Japan.

Composition

Changes since the opening session 
(as of September 12, 2012)

Note: This list includes not only the net result, but all gains and losses by parliamentary group except for very short transitional periods as an independent. Example: Kaoru Yosano who was a Liberal Democrat in the opening session and is an independent as of April 2012 shows up eight times: he (1.) left the LDP, (2.) co-founded the SPJ, (3.) left the SPJ, (4.) became an independent, (5.) stopped being an independent, (6.) joined the DPJ group, (7.) left the DPJ group and (8.) became an independent.
 Democratic Party – Independent Club (election result by party: DPJ 308, NPN 1, NPD 1; strength in the opening session of the 172nd Diet: 312)
 left: Yokomichi (elected Speaker), Ishikawa, Y. Tanaka, Kawakami (resigned), C. Kobayashi (resigned), Hide. Gotō (resigned), Masazumi Nakajima, M. Suzuki (election invalid), Y. Ishida (resigned), Y. Satō, Matsuki, Yokokume, Yosano, Masaki Nakajima, Chūgo, Ishida, M. Kobayashi, Miwa, Y. Saitō, Toyoda, Uchiyama, K. Watanabe, Yoshihiko Watanabe, Asano, Hirayama, T. Kiuchi, T. Taira, Takamura, I. Ozawa, Aihara, Aoki, Azuma, A. Ishii, Y. Ishihara, K. Ōtani, Ōyama, Ōta, Okajima, E. Okamoto, Kasahara, Ken. Kaneko, Kawashima, Take. Kimura, Kikuchi, Kyōno, Kumagai, Kuroda, Ya. Komiyama, T. Koga, Zukeran, Sugekawa, K. Suzuki, K. Takamatsu, D. Tamaki, Nakanowatari, Hagihara, K. Hata, Hidaka, K. Fukushima, Maki, T. Matsuzaki, Miyake, F. Murakami, K. Yamaoka, Yokoyama, G. Katō, Nakatsugawa, K. Kobayashi, T. Koizumi
 joined: Nakaya (proportional replacement), Tsujimoto, Asano (PR replacement), Yosano, Miura (PR replacement)
 Liberal Democratic Party – Assembly of Independents (election result: LDP 119; strength in opening session: 119)
 left: S. Etō (elected Vice-Speaker), K. Hatoyama, Yosano, H. Sonoda, Machimura (resigned), Ōmura, Matsunami
 joined: Nakamura, Imazu (PR replacement), Machimura (by-election), Mochizuki (PR replacement), Niwa (by-election), M. Kiuchi, R. Koizumi
 People's Life first – Kizuna (Founded as Kokumin no Seikatsu ga Daiichi – Mushozoku no Ayumi, "People's Life First – Path of Independents", until merger with Kizuna group)
 founding members: I. Ozawa, Aihara, Aoki, Azuma, A. Ishii, Y. Ishihara, K. Ōtani, Ōyama, Ōta, Okajima, E. Okamoto, Kasahara, Ken. Kaneko, Kawashima, Take. Kimura, Kikuchi, Kyōno, Kumagai, Kuroda, Ya. Komiyama, T. Koga, Zukeran, Sugekawa, K. Suzuki, K. Takamatsu, D. Tamaki, Nakanowatari, Hagihara, K. Hata, Hidaka, K. Fukushima, Maki, T. Matsuzaki, Miyake, F. Murakami, K. Yamaoka, Yokoyama
 joined: G. Katō
 Kizuna Party (joint parliamentary group since July 2012)
 founding members: Uchiyama, Chūgo, Ishida, M. Kobayashi, Miwa, Y. Saitō, Toyoda, K. Watanabe, Yoshihiko Watanabe
 Kōmeitō (election result: Kōmeitō 21; strength in opening session: 21)
 left: Kanzaki (resigned)
 joined: Tōyama (PR replacement)
 Japanese Communist Party (election result: JCP 9; strength in opening session: 9)
 no changes
 Social Democratic Party – Citizen's Alliance (election result: SDP 7; strength in opening session: 7)
 left: Tsujimoto
 Your Party (election result: YP 5; strength in opening session: 5)
 no changes
 Tax Cuts Japan – Peace
 founding members: T. Koizumi, K. Kobayashi, Y. Satō, T. Taira
 Reform Group of Independents
 founding members: T. Kiuchi, Masaki Nakajima, Yokokume
 joined: Nakatsugawa
 People's New Party – Group of Independents (election result: PNP 3; strength in opening session: 3; joint "People's New Party – New Party Nippon" group from 2010 to 2012)
 joined: Y. Tanaka, Masazumi Nakajima, Hirayama
 left: Y. Tanaka, Kamei, Matsushita (died)
 New Party Daichi – True Democrats
 founding members: Asano, Matsuki, Ishikawa
 Sunrise Party of Japan
 founding members: Hiranuma, H. Sonoda, Yosano
 left: Yosano
 Kokueki to Kokumin no Seikatsu o mamoru Kai ("Hiranuma group"; strength in opening session: 3)
 left: Hiranuma
 remaining at time of merger into LDP group: M. Kiuchi, R. Koizumi
 Independents (election result: I 6; strength in opening session: 1)
 became independents: Yokomichi (Speaker), S. Etō (Vice-Speaker), Ishikawa, K. Hatoyama, Tsujimoto, Masazumi Nakajima, Ōmura, Yosano, Doi, Y. Satō, Matsuki, Yokokume, Yosano, Masaki Nakajima, Kamei, Y. Tanaka, Hirayama, T. Kiuchi, T. Taira, Takamura, Matsunami
 stopped being independents: Nakamura, Tsujimoto, Yosano, Ōmura (resigned), Masazumi Nakajima, Matsuki, Ishikawa, Hirayama, Takamura (resigned), T. Kiuchi, Masaki Nakajima, Yokokume, Y. Satō, T. Taira

List of representatives elected in the general election
As of 16 September 2009 (opening session of the 172nd (special) Diet after election of House of Representatives Speaker, Vice-Speaker and Prime Minister)
Note: Affiliation among Representatives elected may change at any given time.

The Government

Democratic Party (311 members)

Jun Azumi
Yukihiko Akutsu
Yoshinobu Achiha
Shino Aihara
Ai Aoki
Hirotaka Akamatsu
Shozo Azuma
Shinsuke Amiya
Satoshi Arai
Fumihiko Igarashi
Masae Ido
Motohisa Ikeda
Koichiro Ichimura
Akira Ishii
Toshiro Ishii
Tomohiro Ishikawa
Eiko Ishige
Takashi Ishizeki
Katsuyuki Ishida
Mitsuji Ishida
Yoshihiro Ishida
Masao Ishizu
Yozaburo Ishihara
Hisatsugu Ishimori
Keiki Ishiyama
Kenta Izumi
Kayoko Isogai
Koichiro Ichimura
Masaaki Itokawa
Shuji Inatomi
Tetsuo Inami
Masato Imai
Akira Uchiyama
Akashi Uchikoshi
Yukio Ubukata
Takako Ebata
Yukio Edano
Junya Ogawa
Ichiro Ozawa
Sakihito Ozawa
Masatoshi Onoduka
Mai Ohara
Rintaro Ogata
Hiroko Oizumi
Hiroshi Ogushi
Atsushi Oshima
Kei Otani
Nobumori Otani
Kensuke Onishi
Takanori Onishi
Akihiro Ohata
Masahiro Oyama
Kazumi Ota
Seiji Osaka
Kazumasa Okajima
Katsuya Okada
Yasuhiro Okada
Eiko Okamoto
Mitsunori Okamoto
Ken Okuda
Soichiro Okuno
Tenzo Okumura
Koichi Kato
Gaku Kato
Michihiko Kano
Banri Kaieda
Masaaki Kakinuma
Tamiko Kasahara
Yasuhiro Kajiwara
Koichiro Katsumata
Tadashi Kanamori
Kenichi Kaneko
Yosuke Kamiyama
Hiroshi Kawauchi
Hiroshi Kawaguchi (independent)
Hiroshi Kawaguchi
Takahiro Kawagoe
Tomotaro Kawashima
Tatsuo Kawabata
Hidesaburo Kawamura (independent)
Mitsue Kawakami
Naoto Kan (Prime Minister)
Takatane Kiuchi
Taketsuka Kimura
Shuji Kira
Takashi Kii
Toru Kikawada
Makiko Kikuta
Chouemon Kikuchi
Shuhei Kishimoto
Keiro Kitagami
Kimiko Kyouno
Hitomi Kudo
Mari Kushibuchi
Daizo Kusuda
Tetsuo Kutsukake
Sadatoshi Kumagai
Atsushi Kumada
Takahiro Kuroiwa
Yu Kuroda
Isao Kuwabara
Koichiro Gemba
Toshiaki Koizumi
Tadamasa Kodaira
Koki Kobayashi
Chiyomi Kobayashi
Masae Kobayashi
Yasuko Komiyama
Yoko Komiyama
Hisaaki Komuro
Nobuhiro Koyama
Issei Koga

Takaaki Koga
Hidetomo Goto
Hitoshi Goto
Yuichi Goto
Kazuko Koori
Kazuya Kondo
Shoichi Kondo
Yosuke Kondo
Takahiro Sasaki
Yuko Sato
Takeshi Saiki
Susumu Saito
Tsuyoshi Saito
Yasunori Saito
Takehiro Sakaguchi
Naoto Sakaguchi
Ryuzo Sasaki
Takeshi Shina
Takashi Shinohara
Masanao Shibahashi
Mitsu Shimojo
Koriki Jojima
Yoichi Shiraishi
Hideo Jinpu
Nobuhio Suto
Chobin Zukeran
Yoshinori Suematsu
Kazumi Sugimoto
Hiroshi Sugekawa
Katsumasa Suzuki
Muneo Suzuki (New Party Daichi)
Yoshito Sengoku
Yasuhiro Sonoda
Seiki Soramoto
Kaname Tajima
Issei Tajima
Masayo Tanabu
Keishu Tanaka
Makiko Tanaka
Mieko Tanaka
Yasuo Tanaka (New Party Nippon)
Kenji Tamura
Tomoyuki Taira
Takashi Takai
Miho Takai
Yoshiaki Takaki
Mamoru Takano
Shoichi Takahashi
Hideyuki Takahashi
Kazuo Takamatsu
Tsutomu Takamura
Satoshi Takayama
Makoto Taki
Mitsuaki Takeda
Koichi Takemasa
Hidenori Tachibana
Tomoko Tamaki
Yuichiro Tamaki
Denny Tamaki
Kimiyoshi Tamaki
Shinji Tarutoko
Atsushi Chugo
Shougo Tsugawa
Kyoichi Tsushima
Keisuke Tsumura
Megumu Tsuji
Nobutaka Tsutsui
Yoshio Tezuka
Manabu Terata
Ryuichi Doi
Seiichiro Dokyu
Yoshitada Tomioka
Juntaro Toyoda
Hiroshi Nakai
Osamu Nakagawa
Masaharu Nakagawa
Masaki Nakajima
Masazumi Nakajima
Hirosato Nakatsugawa
Ikko Nakatsuka
Yasuhiro Nakane
Kansei Nakano
Joe Nakano
Noriko Nakanowatari
Mieko Nakabayashi
Yoshikatsu Nakayama
Hiroko Nakano
Takako Nagae
Takashi Nagao
Akihisa Nagashima
Kazuyoshi Nagashima
Akira Nagatsuma
Takashi Nagayasu
Hirobumi Niki
Chinami Nishimura
Minoru Nogi
Kuniyoshi Noda
Yoshihiko Noda
Tsutomu Hata
Hitoshi Hagihara
Kiyohito Hashimoto
Hiroaki Hashimoto
Ben Hashimoto
Koji Hata
Yoshio Hachiro
Akihiro Hatsushika
Yukio Hatoyama
Hiroki Hanasaki
Hiroshi Hamamoto
Kumiko Hayakawa
Kazuhiro Haraguchi
Yutaka Banno

Toshikazu Higuchi
Takeshi Hidaka
Hideo Hiraoka
Hirofumi Hirano
Tairou Hirayama
Kenichiro Fukushima
Nobuyuki Fukushima
Akio Fukuda
Eriko Fukuda
Hirohisa Fujii
Kazue Fujita
Daisuke Fujita
Norihiko Fujita
Osamu Fujimura
Motohisa Furukawa
Shinichiro Furumoto
Ritsuo Hosokawa
Goshi Hosono
Hiranao Honda
Sumio Mabuchi
Seiji Maehara
Yoshio Maki
Seishu Makino
Hirotaka Matsuoka
Kenko Matsuki
Kimiaki Matsuzaki
Tetsuhisa Matsuzaki
Yorihisa Matsuno
Jin Matsubara
Isao Matsumiya
Daisuke Matsumoto
Takeaki Matsumoto
Ryu Matsumoto
Taizo Mikatsuki
Mitsuo Mitani
Kazuya Mimura
Yukiko Miyake
Nobuaki Miwa
Wakio Mitsui
Tomohiko Mizuno
Inao Minayoshi
Takeshi Miyazaki
Daisuke Miyajima
Koichi Mukoyama
Muneaki Murai
Fumiyoshi Murakami
Hirotami Murakoshi
Hideko Muroi
Kentaro Motomura
Yoiciro Morioka
Kazuyoshi Morimoto
Tetsuo Morimoto
Hiroyuki Moriyama
Kouji Yazaki
Hajime Yatagawa
Kazumi Yanagita
Shiori Yamao
Kenji Yamaoka
Tatsumaru Yamaoka
Kazuyuki Yamaguchi
Tsuyoshi Yamaguchi
Maya Yamazaki
Makoto Yamazaki
Masahiko Yamada
Ryoji Yamada
Kazunori Yamanoi
Ikuo Yamahana
Gosei Yamamoto
Shunji Yuhara
Michiyoshi Yunoki
Katuhito Yokokume
Katsuhiko Yokomitsu
Hokuto Yokoyama
Masashige Yoshikawa
Izumi Yoshida
Osamu Yoshida
Koichi Yoshida
Tsunehiko Yoshida
Hirofumi Ryu
Miki Wajima
Takashi Wada
Yasuhiko Wakai
Seizō Wakaizumi
Eiichiro Washio
Koichiro Watanabe
Shu Watanabe
Yoshihiko Watanabe
Kozo Watanabe

People's New Party (4 Members)
Shizuka Kamei
Tadahiro Matsushita
Mikio Shimoji
Yasuo Tanaka

The Opposition

Liberal Democratic Party (118 members)

Ichiro Aisawa
Ryosei Akazawa
Kenya Akiba
Tarō Asō
Shinzo Abe
Toshiko Abe
Akira Amari
Masatoshi Ishida
Shigeru Ishiba
Nobuteru Ishihara
Yoshitaka Ito
Tomomi Inada
Shinji Inoue
Bummei Ibuki
Masahiro Imamura
Takeshi Iwaya
Akinori Eto
Taku Eto
Toshiaki Endo
Tadamori Oshima
Yoshinori Ohno
Hideaki Omura
Yasuhiro Ozato
Itsunori Onodera
Yuko Obuchi
Hiroshi Kajiyama
Katsunobu Kato
Koichi Kato
Kazuyoshi Kaneko
Yasushi Kaneko
Katsutoshi Kaneda
Ichiro Kamoshita
Katsuyuki Kawai
Jiro Kawasaki
Takeo Kawamura
Fumio Kishida
Shigeo Kitamura
Seigo Kitamura
Tarō Kimura
Yuriko Koike
Shinjiro Koizumi
Taro Kono
Masahiko Komura
Makoto Koga
Masazumi Gotoda
Mitsue Kondo
Ken Saito
Tetsushi Sakamoto
Genichiro Sata
Tatsuo Sato (politician)
Yasuhisa Shiozaki
Ryu Shionoya
Masahiko Shibayama
Hakubun Shimomura
Yoshitaka Shindo
Yoshihide Suga
Isshu Sugawara
Hiroyuki Sonoda
Masaaki Taira

Sanae Takaichi
Tsuyoshi Takagi
Wataru Takeshita
Ryota Takeda
Tsutomu Takebe
Naokazu Takemoto
Keiichiro Tachibana
Kazunori Tanaka
Yasufumi Tanahashi
Koichi Tani
Sadakazu Tanigaki
Yaichi Tanigawa
Takashi Tanihata
Ryotaro Tanose
Norihisa Tamura
Takeshi Tokuda
Keiko Nagaoka
Hidenao Nakagawa
Tadayoshi Nagashima
Jinen Nagase
Gen Nakatani
Toshihiro Nikai
Akira Nishino
Yasutoshi Nishimura
Fukushiro Nukaga
Seiko Noda
Takeshi Noda
Hiroshi Hase
Kunio Hatoyama
Yasukazu Hamada
Motoo Hayashi
Takuya Hirai
Katsuei Hirasawa
Teru Fukui
Yasuo Fukuda
Yoshihisa Furukawa
Keiji Furuya
Hiroyuki Hosoda
Kosuke Hori
Nobutaka Machimura
Kenta Matsunami
Hirokazu Matsuno
Jun Matsumoto
Norio Mitsuya
Mitsuhiro Miyakoshi
Seiichiro Murakami
Yoshitaka Murata
Toshimitsu Motegi
Eisuke Mori
Yoshiro Mori
Hiroshi Moriyama
Takuji Yanagimoto
Shunichi Yamaguchi
Koichi Yamamoto
Kozo Yamamoto
Taku Yamamoto
Yuji Yamamoto
Kaoru Yosano
Masayoshi Yoshino

Komeito Party (21 Members)
Masao Akamatsu
Yoshihisa Inoue
Yasuko Ikenobo
Keiichi Ishii
Noritoshi Ishida
Hisashi Inatsu
Yoshio Urushibara
Yasuyuki Eda
Otohiko Endo
Yoshinori Ooguchi
Takenori Kanzaki
Shigeki Sato
Tetsuo Saito
Chikara Sakaguchi
Michiyo Takagi
Yosuke Takagi
Yuzuru Takeuchi
Shigeyuki Tomita
Hiroyoshi Nishi
Junji Higashi
Noriko Furuya

Japan Communist Party (9 Members)
Seiken Akamine
Akira Kasai
Keiji Kokuta
Kensho Sasaki
Kazuo Shii
Tetsuya Shiokawa
Chizuko Takahashi
Takeshi Miyamoto
Hidekatsu Yoshii

Social Democratic Party / Citizen's Alliance (7 Members)
Tomoko Abe
Yasumasa Shigeo
Kiyomi Tsujimoto
Kantoku Teruya
Takatoshi Nakashima
Ryoichi Hattori
Hideo Yoshiizumi

Your Party (5 Members)
Keiichiro Asao
Kenji Eda
Mito Kakizawa
Koichi Yamauchi
Yoshimi Watanabe

Group for upholding national interest and citizens' livelihoods (3 Members)
Minoru Kiuchi
Ryuji Koizumi
Takeo Hiranuma

Independents (3 Members)
Takahiro Yokomichi, President (gichō) or Speaker (previously DPJ)
Seishiro Eto, Vice President (fuku-gichō) or vice-speaker (previously LDP)
Kishiro Nakamura

List of representatives elected in the general election as proportional replacements
Kiyohiko Tōyama (2010 Kyūshū PR block replacement for Takenori Kanzaki from the Kōmeitō list)
Daisuke Nakaya (2010 Kyūshū block replacement for Hidetomo Gotō from the DPJ list)
Takahiro Asano (2010 Hokkaidō PR block replacement for Muneo Suzuki from the New Party Daichi list)
Hiroshi Imazu (2010 Hokkaidō block replacement for Nobutaka Machimura from the LDP list)
Yoshio Mochizuki (2011 Tōkai PR block replacement for Hideaki Ōmura from the LDP list)
Noboru Miura (2012 Chūgoku PR block replacement for Tsutomu Takamura from the DPJ list)

List of representatives elected in by-elections
Nobutaka Machimura (October 2010, Hokkaidō 5, vacated by Chiyomi Kobayashi)
Hideki Niwa (April 2011, Aichi 6, vacated by Yoshihiro Ishida)

References

See also
 Results of the Japanese general election, 2009 (lists Representatives elected by constituency)

Politics of Japan
Japan politics-related lists
21st-century Japanese politicians